Rhacophorus reinwardtii is a species of frog in the family Rhacophoridae. It is variously known under the common names of black-webbed treefrog, green flying frog, Reinwardt's flying frog, or Reinwardt's treefrog. Before 2006, Rhacophorus reinwardtii and Rhacophorus kio were considered to be the same species. It is not considered threatened by the IUCN.

Distribution 
It is found in China, Indonesia, Laos, Malaysia, Thailand, and Vietnam, and possibly Brunei and Myanmar. Its natural habitats are subtropical or tropical moist lowland forest, subtropical or tropical moist montane forest, freshwater marshes, and intermittent freshwater marshes.

Morphology 
They can be either light green or dark green colors and they have black spots around their backs and heads. Males can have more colors on the sides of their abdomens, such as orange, green, purple, black, and yellow. Their eyes can be light green, light yellow or light grey. They have horizontal pupils.

References

External links 
 
 Amphibian and Reptiles of Peninsular Malaysia - Rhacophorus reinwardtii

reinwardtii
Amphibians described in 1840
Taxonomy articles created by Polbot